Pathrose Ayyaneth (1928 - 2008), popularly known as P. Ayyaneth, was a Malayalam-language novelist, short story writer and poet from Kerala, India. Born in 1928 at Nariyapuram, Pathanamthitta, Ayyaneth graduated in mathematics and worked as a teacher, journalist and government employee. After retiring as assistant director of the Bureau of Economics and Statistics, he practised as a lawyer. His entered the literary field with a poem titled Parimalam, written at the age of 15. He soon began writing prose. Many of his novels appeared as serials in periodicals in 1960s and 1970s. A prolific writer, he had penned 40 novels, 10 short story collections, a few plays and articles. His widely read novels included Manushya Nee Mannakunnu, Thiruseshippu and Vazhvemayam. Six of his novels have become films. Ayyaneth died in a hospital on 17 June 2008 of injuries suffered in a road accident. He was hit by a scooter while he was crossing the road near his house in Kumarapuram.

References

1928 births
2008 deaths
People from Pathanamthitta
Indian male novelists
Novelists from Kerala
Malayali people
Malayalam-language writers
Malayalam novelists
Malayalam short story writers
Malayalam poets
Pedestrian road incident deaths
Road incident deaths in India
20th-century Indian novelists
Indian male short story writers
20th-century Indian short story writers
20th-century Indian male writers